Structural equation modeling (SEM) is a label for a diverse set of methods used by scientists in both experimental and observational research across the sciences, business, and other fields. It is used most in the social and behavioral sciences.

SEM involves the construction of a model, to represent how various aspects of an observable or theoretical phenomenon are thought to be causally structurally related to one another. The structural aspect of the model implies theoretical associations between variables that represent the phenomenon under investigation. The postulated causal structuring is often depicted with arrows representing causal connections between variables (as in Figures 1 and 2) but these causal connections can be equivalently represented as equations. The causal structures imply that specific patterns of connections should appear among the values of the variables, and the observed connections between the variables’ values are used to estimate the magnitudes of the causal effects, and to test whether or not the observed data are consistent with the postulated causal structuring. The equations in SEM are mathematical and statistical properties that are implied by the model and its structural features, and then estimated with statistical algorithms (usually based on matrix algebra and generalized linear models) run on experimental or observational data. 

The boundary between what is and is not a structural equation model is not always clear but SE models often contain postulated causal connections among a set of latent variables (variables thought to exist but which can’t be directly observed) and causal connections linking the postulated latent variables to variables that can be observed and whose values are available in some data set. Variations among the styles of latent causal connections, variations among the observed variables measuring the latent variables, and variations in the statistical estimation strategies result in the SEM toolkit including confirmatory factor analysis, confirmatory composite analysis, path analysis, multi-group modeling, longitudinal modeling, partial least squares path modeling, latent growth modeling and hierarchical or multilevel modeling.

Use of SEM is commonly justified because it helps identify latent variables that are believed to exist, but cannot be directly observed (like an attitude, intelligence or mental illness). Although there are not always clear boundaries of what is and what is not SEM, it generally involves path models (see also path analysis) and measurement models (see also factor analysis) and always employs statistical models and computer programs to investigate the structural connections between latent variables underlying the actual variables taken from observed data. Researchers using SEM employ software programs to estimate the strength and sign of a coefficient for each modeled arrow (the numbers shown in Figure 1 for example), and to provide diagnostic clues suggesting which indicators or model components might produce inconsistency between the model and the data. Criticisms of SEM methods hint at mathematical formulation problems, a tendency to accept models without establishing external validity, and potential philosophical bias.

A SEM suggesting that intelligence (as measured by four questions) can predict academic performance (as measured by SAT, ACT, and high school GPA) is shown in Figure 1. The concept of human intelligence cannot be measured directly in the way that one could measure height or weight. Instead, researchers have a theory and conceptualization of intelligence and then design measurement instruments such as a questionnaire or test that provides them with multiple indicators of intelligence. These indicators are then combined in a model to create a plausible way of measuring intelligence as a latent variable (the circle for intelligence in Figure 1) from the indicators (square boxes with scale 1–4 in Figure 1). Figure 1 is presented as a final model, after running it and obtaining all estimates (the numbers on the arrows). There is no consensus on the best symbolic notation to represent SEMs, for example Figure 2 represents a similar model as Figure 1 without as many arrows and in a format that might occur prior to running the model. 

A great advantage of SEM is that all of these measurements and tests occur simultaneously in one statistical estimation procedure, where the errors throughout the model are calculated using all information from the model. This means the errors are more accurate than if a researcher were to calculate each part of the model separately.

History 

Structural equation modeling (SEM) has its roots in the work of Sewall Wright who applied explicit causal interpretations to regression equations based on direct and indirect effects of observed variables in population genetics. Lee M. Wolfle compiled an annotated bibliographic history of Sewall Wright's path coefficient method which we know today as path modeling. Wright added two important elements to the standard practice of using regression to predict an outcome. These were (1) to combine information from more than one regression equation using (2) a causal approach to regression modeling rather than merely predictive. Sewall Wright consolidated his method of path analysis in his 1934 article "The Method of Path Coefficients".

Otis Dudley Duncan introduced SEM to the social sciences in 1975 and it flourished throughout the 1970s and 80s. Different yet mathematically related modeling approaches developed in psychology, sociology, and economics. The convergence of two of these developmental streams (factor analysis from psychology, and path analysis from sociology via Duncan) produced the current core of SEM although there is great overlap with econometric practices employing simultaneous equations and exogenous (causal variables).

One of several programs Karl Gustav Jöreskog developed in the early 1970s at Educational Testing Services (LISREL) embedded latent variables (which psychologists knew as the latent factors from factor analysis) within path-analysis-style equations (which sociologists had inherited from Wright and Duncan). The factor-structured portion of the model incorporated measurement errors and thereby permitted measurement-error-adjusted estimation of effects connecting latent variables.

Loose and confusing terminology has been used to obscure weaknesses in the methods. In particular, PLS-PA (also known as PLS-PM) has been conflated with partial least squares regression PLSR, which is a substitute for ordinary least squares regression and has nothing to do with path analysis. PLS-PA has been erroneously promoted as a method that works with small datasets when other estimation approaches fail; in fact, it has been shown that minimum required sample sizes for this method are consistent with those required in multiple regression.

Both LISREL and PLS-PA were conceived as iterative computer algorithms, with an emphasis from the start on creating an accessible graphical and data entry interface and extension of Wright's (1921) path analysis. Early Cowles Commission work on simultaneous equations estimation centered on Koopman and Hood's (1953) algorithms from transport economics and optimal routing, with maximum likelihood estimation, and closed form algebraic calculations, as iterative solution search techniques were limited in the days before computers.

Anderson and Rubin (1949, 1950) developed the limited information maximum likelihood estimator for the parameters of a single structural equation, which indirectly included the two-stage least squares estimator and its asymptotic distribution (Anderson, 2005) (Farebrother, 1999). Two-stage least squares was originally proposed as a method of estimating the parameters of a single structural equation in a system of linear simultaneous equations, being introduced by Theil (1953a, 1953b, 1961) and more or less independently by Basmann (1957) and Sargan (1958). Anderson's limited information maximum likelihood estimation was eventually implemented in a computer search algorithm, where it competed with other iterative SEM algorithms. Of these, two-stage least squares was by far the most widely used method in the 1960s and the early 1970s.

Systems of regression equation approaches were developed at the Cowles Commission from the 1950s on, extending the transportation modeling of Tjalling Koopmans. Sewall Wright and other statisticians attempted to promote path analysis methods at Cowles (then at the University of Chicago). University of Chicago statisticians identified many faults with path analysis applications to the social sciences; faults which did not pose significant problems for identifying gene transmission in Wright's context, but which made path methods such as PLS-PA and LISREL problematic in the social sciences. Freedman (1987) summarized these objections in path analyses: "failure to distinguish among causal assumptions, statistical implications, and policy claims has been one of the main reasons for the suspicion and confusion surrounding quantitative methods in the social sciences" (see also Wold's (1987) response). Wright's path analysis never gained a large following among US econometricians, but was successful in influencing Hermann Wold and his student Karl Jöreskog. Jöreskog's student Claes Fornell promoted LISREL in the US.

Advances in computers made it simple for novices to apply structural equation methods in the computer-intensive analysis of large datasets in complex, unstructured problems. The most popular solution techniques fall into three classes of algorithms: (1) ordinary least squares algorithms applied independently to each path, such as applied in the so-called PLS path analysis packages which estimate with OLS; (2) covariance analysis algorithms evolving from seminal work by Wold and his student Karl Jöreskog implemented in LISREL, AMOS, and EQS; and (3) simultaneous equations regression algorithms developed at the Cowles Commission by Tjalling Koopmans.

Pearl has extended SEM from linear to nonparametric models, and proposed causal and counterfactual interpretations of the equations. For example, excluding a variable Z from the arguments of an equation asserts that the dependent variable is independent of interventions on the excluded variable, once we hold constant the remaining arguments. Nonparametric SEMs permit the estimation of total, direct and indirect effects without making any commitment to the form of the equations or to the distributions of the error terms. This extends mediation analysis to systems involving categorical variables in the presence of nonlinear interactions. Bollen and Pearl survey the history of the causal interpretation of SEM and why it has become a source of confusions and controversies.

SEM path analysis methods are popular in the social sciences because of their accessibility; packaged computer programs allow researchers to obtain results without the inconvenience of understanding experimental design and control, effect and sample sizes, and numerous other factors that are part of good research design. Supporters say that this reflects a holistic, and less blatantly causal, interpretation of many real world phenomena – especially in psychology and social interaction – than may be adopted in the natural sciences; detractors suggest that many flawed conclusions have been drawn because of this lack of experimental control.

Direction in the directed network models of SEM arises from presumed cause-effect assumptions made about reality. Social interactions and artifacts are often epiphenomena – secondary phenomena that are difficult to directly link to causal factors. An example of a physiological epiphenomenon is, for example, time to complete a 100-meter sprint. A person may be able to improve their sprint speed from 12 seconds to 11 seconds, but it will be difficult to attribute that improvement to any direct causal factors, like diet, attitude, weather, etc. The 1 second improvement in sprint time is an epiphenomenon – the holistic product of interaction of many individual factors.

General approach to SEM 
Although each technique in the SEM family is different, the following aspects are common to many SEM methods, as it can be summarized as a 4E framework by many SEM scholars like Alex Liu, that is 1) Equation (model or equation specification), 2) Estimation of free parameters, 3) Evaluation of models and model fit, 4) Explanation and communication, as well as execution of results.

Model specification 

Two main components of models are distinguished in SEM: the structural model showing potential causal dependencies between endogenous and exogenous variables, and the measurement model showing the relations between latent variables and their indicators. Exploratory and confirmatory factor analysis models, for example, contain only the measurement part, while path diagrams can be viewed as SEMs that contain only the structural part.

In specifying pathways in a model, the modeler can posit two types of relationships: (1) free pathways, in which hypothesized causal (in fact counterfactual) relationships between variables are tested, and therefore are left 'free' to vary, and (2) relationships between variables that already have an estimated relationship, usually based on previous studies, which are 'fixed' in the model.

A modeler will often specify a set of theoretically plausible models in order to assess whether the model proposed is the best of the set of possible models. Not only must the modeler account for the theoretical reasons for building the model as it is, but the modeler must also take into account the number of data points and the number of parameters that the model must estimate to identify the model.

An identified model is a model where a specific parameter value uniquely identifies the model (recursive definition), and no other equivalent formulation can be given by a different parameter value. A data point is a variable with observed scores, like a variable containing the scores on a question or the number of times respondents buy a car. The parameter is the value of interest, which might be a regression coefficient between the exogenous and the endogenous variable or the factor loading (regression coefficient between an indicator and its factor). If there are fewer data points than the number of estimated parameters, the resulting model is "unidentified", since there are too few reference points to account for all the variance in the model. The solution is to constrain one of the paths to zero, which means that it is no longer part of the model.

Estimation of free parameters 
Parameter estimation is done by comparing the actual covariance matrices representing the relationships between variables and the estimated covariance matrices of the best fitting model. This is obtained through numerical maximization via expectation–maximization of a fit criterion as provided by maximum likelihood estimation, quasi-maximum likelihood estimation, weighted least squares or asymptotically distribution-free methods. This is often accomplished by using a specialized SEM analysis program, of which several exist.

Evaluation of models and model fit 

Having estimated a model, analysts will want to interpret the model. Estimated paths may be tabulated and/or presented graphically as a path model. The impact of variables is assessed using path tracing rules (see path analysis).

It is important to examine the "fit" of an estimated model to determine how well it models the data. This is a basic task in SEM modeling, forming the basis for accepting or rejecting models and, more usually, accepting one competing model over another. The output of SEM programs includes matrices of the estimated relationships between variables in the model. Assessment of fit essentially calculates how similar the predicted data are to matrices containing the relationships in the actual data.

Formal statistical tests and fit indices have been developed for these purposes. Individual parameters of the model can also be examined within the estimated model in order to see how well the proposed model fits the driving theory. Most, though not all, estimation methods make such tests of the model possible.

Of course as in all statistical hypothesis tests, SEM model tests are based on the assumption that the correct and complete relevant data have been modeled. In the SEM literature, discussion of fit has led to a variety of different recommendations on the precise application of the various fit indices and hypothesis tests.

There are differing approaches to assessing fit. Traditional approaches to modeling start from a null hypothesis, rewarding more parsimonious models (i.e. those with fewer free parameters), to others such as AIC that focus on how little the fitted values deviate from a saturated model  (i.e. how well they reproduce the measured values), taking into account the number of free parameters used. Because different measures of fit capture different elements of the fit of the model, it is appropriate to report a selection of different fit measures. Guidelines (i.e., "cutoff scores") for interpreting fit measures, including the ones listed below, are the subject of much debate among SEM researchers.

Some of the more commonly used measures of fit include
 Chi-squared 
 A fundamental measure of fit used in the calculation of many other fit measures. It is a function of the sample size and the discrepancy between the observed covariance matrix and the model covariance matrix.
 Akaike information criterion (AIC)
 A test of relative model fit: The preferred model is the one with the lowest AIC value.
 
 where k is the number of parameters in the statistical model, and L is the maximized value of the likelihood of the model.
 Root Mean Square Error of Approximation (RMSEA)
Fit index where a value of zero indicates the best fit. While the guideline for determining a "close fit" using RMSEA is highly contested,  most researchers concur that an RMSEA of .1 or more indicates poor fit.
 Standardized Root Mean Squared Residual (SRMR)
 The SRMR is a popular absolute fit indicator. Hu and Bentler (1999) suggested .08 or smaller as a guideline for good fit. Kline (2011) suggested .1 or smaller as a guideline for good fit.
 Comparative Fit Index (CFI)
In examining baseline comparisons, the CFI depends in large part on the average size of the correlations in the data.  If the average correlation between variables is not high, then the CFI will not be very high. A CFI value of .95 or higher is desirable.

For each measure of fit, a decision as to what represents a good-enough fit between the model and the data must reflect other contextual factors such as sample size, the ratio of indicators to factors, and the overall complexity of the model. For example, very large samples make the Chi-squared test overly sensitive and more likely to indicate a lack of model-data fit.

Model modification 
The model may need to be modified in order to improve the fit, thereby estimating the most likely relationships between variables. Many programs provide modification indices which may guide minor modifications. Modification indices report the change in χ² that result from freeing fixed parameters: usually, therefore adding a path to a model which is currently set to zero. Modifications that improve model fit may be flagged as potential changes that can be made to the model. Modifications to a model, especially the structural model, are changes to the theory claimed to be true. Modifications therefore must make sense in terms of the theory being tested, or be acknowledged as limitations of that theory. Changes to measurement model are effectively claims that the items/data are impure indicators of the latent variables specified by theory.

Models should not be led by modification indices, as Maccallum (1986) demonstrated: "even under favorable conditions, models arising from specification searches must be viewed with caution."

Sample size and power 

While researchers agree that large sample sizes are required to provide sufficient statistical power and precise estimates using SEM, there is no general consensus on the appropriate method for determining adequate sample size.  Generally, the considerations for determining sample size include the number of observations per parameter, the number of observations required for fit indexes to perform adequately, and the number of observations per degree of freedom. Researchers have proposed guidelines based on simulation studies, professional experience, and mathematical formulas.

Sample size requirements to achieve a particular significance and power in SEM hypothesis testing are similar for the same model when any of the three algorithms (PLS-PA, LISREL or systems of regression equations) are used for testing.

Explanation and communication 
The set of models are then interpreted so that claims about the constructs can be made, based on the best fitting model.

Caution should always be taken when making claims of causality even when experimentation or time-ordered studies have been done.  The term causal model must be understood to mean "a model that conveys causal assumptions", not necessarily a model that produces validated causal conclusions.  Collecting data at multiple time points and using an experimental or quasi-experimental design can help rule out certain rival hypotheses but even a randomized experiment cannot rule out all such threats to causal inference.  Good fit by a model consistent with one causal hypothesis invariably entails equally good fit by another model consistent with an opposing causal hypothesis. No research design, no matter how clever, can help distinguish such rival hypotheses, save for interventional experiments.

As in any science, subsequent replication and perhaps modification will proceed from the initial finding.

Advanced uses 
 Measurement invariance
 Multiple group modelling: This is a technique allowing joint estimation of multiple models, each with different sub-groups. Applications include behavior genetics, and analysis of differences between groups (e.g., gender, cultures, test forms written in different languages, etc.).
 Latent growth modeling
Nonlinear mixed-effects model
 Hierarchical/multilevel models; item response theory models
 Mixture model (latent class) SEM
 Alternative estimation and testing techniques
 Robust inference
 Survey sampling analyses
 Multi-method multi-trait models
 Structural Equation Model Trees

SEM-specific software 
Numerous software packages exist for fitting structural equation models. LISREL was the first such software, initially released in the 1970s. Frequently used software implementations among researchers include Mplus, R packages lavaan and sem, LISREL, OpenMx, SPSS AMOS, and Stata. Barbara M. Byrne published multiple instructional books for using a variety of these softwares as part of the Society of Multivariate Experimental Psychology's Multivariate Applications book series.

Scholars consider it good practice to report which software package and version was used for SEM analysis because they have different capabilities and may use slightly different methods to perform similarly named techniques.

See also 
 Causal model
 Graphical model
 Multivariate statistics
 Partial least squares path modeling
 Partial least squares regression
 Simultaneous equations model
 Structural Equations with Latent Variables
Causal map

References

Bibliography

Further reading 

 Bartholomew, D. J., and Knott, M. (1999) Latent Variable Models and Factor Analysis Kendall's Library of Statistics, vol. 7, Edward Arnold Publishers, 
 Bentler, P.M. & Bonett, D.G. (1980), "Significance tests and goodness of fit in the analysis of covariance structures", Psychological Bulletin, 88, 588–606.
 Bollen, K. A. (1989). Structural Equations with Latent Variables. Wiley, 
 Byrne, B. M. (2001) Structural Equation Modeling with AMOS - Basic Concepts, Applications, and Programming.LEA, 
 Goldberger, A. S. (1972). Structural equation models in the social sciences. Econometrica 40, 979- 1001.

 Hoyle, R H (ed) (1995) Structural Equation Modeling: Concepts, Issues, and Applications. SAGE, 

.

External links 
 Structural equation modeling page under David Garson's StatNotes, NCSU
 Issues and Opinion on Structural Equation Modeling, SEM in IS Research
 The causal interpretation of structural equations (or SEM survival kit) by Judea Pearl 2000.
 Structural Equation Modeling Reference List by Jason Newsom: journal articles and book chapters on structural equation models
 Handbook of Management Scales, a collection of previously used multi-item scales to measure constructs for SEM

Graphical models
Latent variable models
Regression models
Structural equation models